Troy Skypark  is a privately owned, public use airport located four nautical miles (5 mi, 7 km) southwest of the central business district of Troy, a city in Miami County, Ohio, United States.

Facilities and aircraft 
Troy Skypark covers an area of 72 acres (29 ha) at an elevation of 930 feet (283 m) above mean sea level. It has one runway designated 5/23 with a turf surface measuring 3,450 by 100 feet (1,052 x 30 m).

For the 12-month period ending May 21, 2012, the airport had 4,264 general aviation aircraft operations, an average of 11 per day. At that time there were 12 aircraft based at this airport, all single-engine.

References

External links 
 Aerial image as of April 1994 from USGS The National Map
 

Airports in Ohio
Transportation in Miami County, Ohio